Clarence Addison "Pudge" MacKenzie (July 11, 1906 - June 11, 1960) was an American ice hockey player. He played 36 games in the National Hockey League with the Chicago Black Hawks during the 1932–33 season. Before playing in the NHL, MacKenzie had played at the collegiate level with Marquette and in the American Hockey Association with the Chicago Shamrocks, the St. Paul Greyhounds and the Tulsa Oilers. Afterwards, he returned to the AHA and played with the Kansas City Greyhounds, retiring in 1940. During two seasons, he was a player-coach with the team.

Career statistics

Regular season and playoffs

References

External links
 

1906 births
1960 deaths
American ice hockey coaches
American men's ice hockey right wingers
Chicago Blackhawks players
Chicago Shamrocks players
Ice hockey coaches from Massachusetts
Ice hockey player-coaches
Ice hockey players from Massachusetts
Kansas City Greyhounds players
Marquette Golden Eagles men's ice hockey players
St. Louis Flyers (AHA) players
St. Paul Greyhounds players
Sportspeople from Cambridge, Massachusetts
Tulsa Oilers (AHA) players